Events from the year 1956 in France.

Incumbents
President: René Coty 
President of the Council of Ministers: Edgar Faure (until 1 February), Guy Mollet (starting 1 February)

Events
2 January – Legislative Election held.
1 February – Socialist leader Guy Mollet becomes prime minister
2 March – Morocco declares its independence from France.
20 March – Tunisia gains independence from France.
23 May – Minister Pierre Mendès-France resigns due to his government's policy on Algeria.
23 June – Loi Cadre passed by the French National Assembly, first step in the creation of the French Union.
10 September – Guy Mollet visits London and proposes a merger of France and the United Kingdom. However the idea is rejected by British Prime Minister Anthony Eden.
28 September – Eden considers allowing France to join the Commonwealth of Nations, but this idea is also rejected.
31 October – Suez Crisis: The United Kingdom and France begin bombing Egypt to force the reopening of the Suez Canal.
6 November – British and French forces seize control of two Egyptian ports before declaring a ceasefire.
7 November – Suez Crisis: The United Nations General Assembly adopts a resolution calling for the United Kingdom, France and Israel to withdraw their troops from Arab lands immediately.
23 December – British and French troops leave Suez Canal. region.
The Tefal cookware firm is established.

Arts and literatures
Two attacks are made on Leonardo da Vinci's Mona Lisa in the Louvre.
28 November – Roger Vadim's film And God Created Woman (Et Dieu… créa la femme), starring Brigitte Bardot, is released.
3 December – Writing under the pseudonym of Emile Ajar, author Romain Gary becomes the only person ever to win the Prix Goncourt twice, this time for Les Racines du ciel.

Sport
5 July – Tour de France begins.
28 July – Tour de France ends, won by Roger Walkowiak.

Births
 1 January – Christine Lagarde, politician
 11 February – Didier Lockwood, jazz violinist (died 2018)
 26 February – Michel Houellebecq, novelist
 28 May – Francis Joyon, yachtsman
 4 July – Éric Neuhoff, novelist and journalist
 28 October – Jean-Luc Montama, karateka
 9 December – Jean-Pierre Thiollet journalist

Deaths
5 January – Mistinguett, singer (born 1875)
3 February – Émile Borel, mathematician and politician (born 1871)
18 February – Gustave Charpentier, composer (born 1860)
17 March – Irène Joliot-Curie, scientist, shared Nobel Prize in Chemistry in 1935 (born 1897)
20 May – Pierre Allemane, international soccer player (born 1882)
11 September – Lucien Febvre, social historian (born 1878)
26 October – Walter Gieseking, pianist and composer (born 1895)
23 November – André Marty, leading figure in the French Communist Party (born 1886)

See also
 1956 in French television
 List of French films of 1956

References

1950s in France